El Salto is a town and seat of the municipality of Pueblo Nuevo in the southwestern part of the Mexican state of Durango.  As of 2015, the town had a total population of 24,241,  Situated on a pine-forested plateau about 2,580 meters (8,464 feet) above sea level in the Sierra Madre mountain range, the town is home to a large lumber industry. It also has a military base. The surrounding municipality has a population of 50,417 and an area of 6,178.3 km² (2,385.45 sq mi).

Climate
El Salto has a subtropical highland climate (Köppen Cwb). Thanks to its location in the high plateau of the Sierra Madre Occidental it receives abundant rain during the summer months; enough for it to avoid the semi-arid (BSk) classification found further inland. Due to its location the town experiences mild but rainy summers, and relatively dry and chilly winters with freezing night temperatures. Winter months witness the occasional snow storm.

References

Link to tables of population data from Census of 2005 INEGI: Instituto Nacional de Estadística, Geografía e Informática
Durango Enciclopedia de los Municipios de México

Populated places in Durango